Loving Sabotage is a Belgian novel by Amélie Nothomb. It was first published in 1993 by the Albin Michel.

Plot
The narrator of Loving Sabotage is a five year old girl who arrives in Beijing in 1972 as the daughter of a Belgian diplomat.  She joins the other children in the diplomatic enclave, engaged in various nasty wars.  She owns a bicycle, which she has convinced herself is a horse. She falls madly in love with a six year old Italian girl and attempts to gain the affections of cruel Elena.  Based in part by Nothomb's own childhood experience in Beijing, the novel includes observations of China under the Gang of Four and on the way Westerners perceived China.

References 

Fiction set in the 1970s
1993 Belgian novels
French-language novels
Novels by Amélie Nothomb
Novels set in Beijing
Éditions Albin Michel books